The R176 road is a regional road in Ireland, running its full length on the Cooley Peninsula in County Louth. It runs between its junction with R173 at Ghan Road, Carlingford and its junction with R175 at Saint James' Well via Carlingford Relief Road and Mullatee.

See also
Roads in Ireland
National primary road
National secondary road

References
Roads Act 1993 (Classification of Regional Roads) Order 2006 – Department of Transport

Regional roads in the Republic of Ireland
Roads in County Louth